Keisha Sean Waites (born October 30, 1972) is an American politician from the state of Georgia. A Democrat, she served in the Georgia House of Representatives from 2012 to 2017, representing southeast Atlanta, College Park, East Point, Hapeville, Forest Park, Hartsfield Jackson Airport, Porsche Headquarters and parts of Clayton and DeKalb counties.

Early life and career
Born in 1972 at Grady Hospital in Atlanta, Georgia, United States, Waites attended Lakeside High School in Dekalb county and graduated in 1991. She then attended Georgia Southern and Atlanta Metropolitan College and graduated with a degree in political science. In 2014, Waites completed Harvard University's John F. Kennedy School of Government program for Senior Executives in State and Local Government as a David Bohnett LGBTQ Victory Institute Leadership Fellow.

Political career
Before winning election to the state legislature in 2012, Waites mounted seven unsuccessful campaigns for elected office:
 2001: Atlanta City Council, at-large post 1 (as Sean Waites)
 2002: State Senate, District 36: placed fourth in the Democratic primary
 2005: Atlanta City Council
 2006: Fulton County Commission
 2008: State House, District 61: lost primary runoff
 2009: Atlanta City Council
 2011: Fulton County Commission: lost runoff

In addition, Waites applied for an appointment to the Atlanta City Council in 2004, one of four candidates who put themselves forward to temporarily fill a vacant seat. The council did not select Waites for the vacancy, choosing Esther Stewart-Moseley instead.

Waites's qualified for the District 60 House seat on January 9, 2012. In the special election, she took 54.2 percent of the vote (321 votes) compared to 18.6 percent (110 votes) for Theresa Middlebrooks and 27.2 percent (161 votes) for Latrenka Riley, thus avoiding a runoff.

Waites resigned from her House seat on September 18, 2017, to run for the chairship of the Fulton County Commission. She finished in second place, ahead of Gabriel Sterling, and advanced to a runoff election, which she lost to incumbent Robb Pitts. She ran in the Democratic primary for Georgia's 13th congressional district against incumbent David Scott, coming in second place in a field of four candidates. She filed for the 5th congressional district special election to fill the remaining term of John Lewis.

In 2021, Waites filed to run for Atlanta City Council Post 3 At-Large to succeed incumbent Andre Dickens (who filed to run for Atlanta Mayor), her fourth bid for a council seat. After winning the largest share of votes in the first round among five candidates, Waites ran in a November 30 runoff with Jacki Labat, winning the runoff 52%-47%.

Personal life
Waites is openly LGBT.

References

External links

1972 births
21st-century American politicians
21st-century American women politicians
African-American women in politics
Georgia Southern University alumni
Lesbian politicians
LGBT African Americans
LGBT state legislators in Georgia (U.S. state)
Living people
Democratic Party members of the Georgia House of Representatives
Women state legislators in Georgia (U.S. state)
Candidates in the 2020 United States elections
21st-century African-American women
21st-century African-American politicians
20th-century African-American people
20th-century African-American women